This list outlines the names of popular lead film actresses, who previously worked or are currently working in the Tamil film industry Kollywood, based in Chennai, Tamil Nadu, India. The list is ordered by the year of their debut as a leading actor or the year of their landmark film. Actresses who have starred in at least five films as lead are included in the list.

1940s

1950s

1960s

1970s

1980s

1990s

2000s

2010s

2020s 

Lists of film actors
Tamil film actors